Zsuzsa Miskó (born 1 October 1971) is a Hungarian gymnast. She competed in six events at the 1988 Summer Olympics.

References

1971 births
Living people
Hungarian female artistic gymnasts
Olympic gymnasts of Hungary
Gymnasts at the 1988 Summer Olympics
Gymnasts from Budapest